Danielle von Zerneck (born December 21, 1965 in North Hollywood, Los Angeles) is an American actress and film producer.

Career
von Zerneck began her acting career in commercials and television films. From 1983 to 1984, she played Louisa "Lou" Swenson on General Hospital. She is perhaps best known for her portrayal of Donna Ludwig, Ritchie Valens' girlfriend in the film La Bamba (1987). Her last acting credit was in the 2001 television film Acceptable Risk, based on the novel of the same name. She has worked primarily as a film and television producer in recent years including Recovery Road, No One Would Tell and Christmas on Honeysuckle Lane.

Personal life
Danielle is the daughter of film producer Frank von Zerneck and actress Julie Mannix (daughter of author Daniel P. Mannix). In 1989, she married James Fearnley, an English accordion player for the Irish folk/punk band The Pogues.

Filmography

Film

Television

References

External links
 
 

1965 births
20th-century American actresses
21st-century American actresses
Actresses from Los Angeles
American child actresses
American film actresses
Film producers from California
American soap opera actresses
American television actresses
Living people
People from North Hollywood, Los Angeles
American women film producers